Bana Malwala  is a village in Kapurthala district of Punjab State, India. The village is administrated by a Sarpanch, who is an elected representative. Bana Malwala is named after Dewan Bana Mal Gautam who hailed from Gautam (Shori Gotra ) Brahmin family of Nawanshahr, Bana Mal was owner of this village he was Manager of Maharja Randhir Singh Ahluwalia of Kapurthala 's Estate in Oudh (UP) in 1862 A.D and Chief minister of Kapurthala Princely State, Banna Mal built Shivala Mandir known as Banna Mal Shivala in Nawanshahr  and also owns Brahampur Village in Phagwara Tehsil.

Demography 
According to the report published by Census India in 2011, Bana Malwala has a total number of 19 houses and population of 111 of which include 51 males and 60 females. Literacy rate of Bana Malwala is 54.74%, lower than state average of 75.84%.  The population of children under the age of 6 years is 16 which is 14.41% of total population of Bana Malwala, and child sex ratio is approximately  1000 higher than state average of 846.

Population data

Air travel connectivity 
The closest airport to the village is Sri Guru Ram Dass Jee International Airport.

Villages in Kapurthala

External links
  Villages in Kapurthala
 Kapurthala Villages List

References

Villages in Kapurthala district